Guy of Ibelin (French: Guy d'Ibelin) (before 1306 – 1350/60) was seneschal of Cyprus from 1318 and a burgher of Venice from 30 December 1334. He was the son of Philip of Ibelin (1253–1318), previous seneschal of Cyprus and Jerusalem by his second wife Maria Embriaco of Giblet (d. 1331). He was evidently held in high regard by King Hugh IV of Cyprus, since he is named in a royal decree from 1329 as a  "magnificus vir" , in charge of four newly created priesthoods in the cathedral of Nicosia.

He married Margaret of Ibelin with papal dispensation in 1319. They had three children:

 John of Ibelin (d. after 1367), seneschal of Cyprus after his father's death
 Alice of Ibelin (d. after 1374), who married John of Lusignan (1329/30-1375), titular Prince of Antioch and Regent of Cyprus
 Margaret of Ibelin

References 

, reprint of article Les Ibelin aux XIIIe et XIVe siècles.

Further reading

External links
Genealogical website for European royalty

See also
 Officers of the Kingdom of Cyprus

Guy
14th-century births
14th-century deaths